Presidential elections were held in Guinea on 14 December 1998. The result was a victory for incumbent President Lansana Conté of the Unity and Progress Party, who received 56.1% of the vote. Voter turnout was 71.4%.

Results

References

Presidential elections in Guinea
Guinea
1998 in Guinea